Aliados (English: Allies) is an Argentine television series created and produced by Cris Morena aired by the network Telefe in Argentina and by the FOX Network to the rest of Latin America. It's aimed at teen and youth audiences. The premiere, which was planned for June 10, 2013, was delayed to June 26, 2013. This show marks the return of producer Cris Morena to television after two years, when her production company closed at the end the telenovela Casi Ángeles, because of the death of her daughter Romina Yan. The series airs in 18 countries, including Israel and some in Europe. The season 1 is composed of 23 episodes for television and 126 webisodes online which are parts from the television episodes.

The series covers social problems such as promiscuity, unwanted pregnancies, bullying, suicide, anorexia, juvenile delinquency, child labour, alcoholism and family violence, among others.

Plot

Season 1
From its origin, the human race has traveled the planet constructing it and destroying it with the same intensity. In the last decades, humans have achieved great advances in science and technology in a very accelerated way. Because of these advances, people have distanced themselves from others to the point that they forgot those who are and are on Earth. In the wake of this oblivion, at the end of 2012, humanity began a 105-day countdown that will lead to either its destruction or revival.

The future of the Earth depends on six young humans: Noah (Juan Pedro Lanzani), Azul (Oriana Sabatini), Maia (Mariel Percossi), Manuel (Agustín Bernasconi), Franco (Julian Serrano) and Valentín (Joaquín Ochoa). They all have something in common: they're as powerful as they are weak, as attractive as they are lost, as revolutionary as they are violent and as isolated as they are connected. With the help of The Feminine Energy Creator (Dolores Fonzi), these young people will be assisted by seven beings of light: Ian (Pablo Martinez), Venecia (Jenny Martinez), Inti (Nicholas Francella), Ámbar (Lola Morán), Luz (Oriana Sabatini), Devi (Carolina Domenech) and Gopal (Maximo Espindola). They come from various parts of the universe with the goal of becoming the Allies of these young people and help in the mission of saving the "human project". After these 105 days, they'll face a new enemy who is closer than they think.

Season 2
The second season premiers on Sunday, April 6, 2014 on Telefe. This season will be focused on the war between the Light Beings (Angels) and their human allies against the Morks (Demons) until it ended on Sunday, August 3, 2014.

Cast and characters

Main characters
Peter Lanzani as Noah García Iturbe
Pablo Martínez as Ian King/Joaquín Gaitán
Oriana Sabatini as Azul Medina/Luz
Julián Serrano as Franco Alfaro
Mariel Percossi as Maia Pinedo
Agustín Bernasconi as Manuel Ramírez
Joaquín Ochoa as Valentín Gaitan
Nicolás Francella as Matías Arce/Inti
Jenny Martinez as Venecia
Lola Morán as Ámbar
Carolina Domenech as Devi
Maximo Espíndola as Gopal

Supporting characters
Juan Leyrado as Energía Creadora Masculina 
Dolores Fonzi as Energía Creadora Femenina 
Paula Reca as Mary
Michel Noher as Taylor
Ingrid García-Jonsson as Bianca Rock
Valentina Zenere as Mara Ulloa
Iván Espeche as Mariano Arce
Boy Olmi as Justo García Iturbe 
Ana Celentano as Elena García Iturbe
Alejandro Botto as Fermín García Iturbe
Joaquín Méndez as Milo García Iturbe
Tomás Fidalgo as Tomás García Iturbe  
Marcelo Serre as Jorge Luis Ramírez
Noemí Frenkel as Josefina de Ramírez
Eugenia Guerty as Natalia Pinedo
Mercedes Funes as Matilda Sánchez
Federico Lama as Paul Vega 
Diego Mariani as Félix Ulloa
Patrizia Camponovo as Lara de Arce
Lucila Viggiano as Gala Noboa
Edgardo Castro as Luis Alfaro
Manuela Viale as Emma
Verónica Pelaccini as Ada  
Eliseo Rentería as Daimon
Roly Serrano as Morales 
Esteban Maggio as Federico 
Agustina Micaela Delun  as Camila

Episodes

Media

Music

The Aliados soundtrack was released on June 11, 2013 and was certified gold record two weeks after its release. The 15 songs on the album are performed by much of the cast and was written by Cris Morena. On October 1, 2013 the CD was certified platinum in Argentina.

Applications
Aliados has released two applications - Aliados Interactivo (for Apple and Android) and Aliados Misiones (for Android).

Aliados Interactivo features trivia, character information, videos and more.
Aliados Misiones is a game where you must solve quests traveling the world of Light Beings. It's similar to Candy Crush.

Trivia 

 Peter Lanzani (Noah), Pablo Martínez (Ian/Joaquín), Paula Reca (Mary) and Mercedes Funes (Matilda), they all had previously worked together, in the same project by Cris Morena : Casi Ángeles.

Awards and nominations

Nominations
 2013 Martín Fierro Awards
 Best program for kids
 Best new actor or actress (Nicolás Francella)
 Best opening theme

Broadcasting

References

External links 

Official site

Spanish-language telenovelas
Telefe telenovelas
2013 telenovelas
Argentine comedy television series
Argentine drama television series
2013 Argentine television series debuts
2014 Argentine television series endings
Spanish-language television shows
Argentine fantasy television series
Argentine comedy-drama television series